AVS or Avs may refer to:

People 

 AVS (actor),  Indian actor and comedian

Sports
 Colorado Avalanche, an NHL hockey team

Schools
 Abbey Vocational School, a secondary school in County Donegal, Ireland
 Amman Valley School, a bilingual (Welsh and English) secondary school in Wales

Science
 American Vacuum Society, a member society of the American Institute of Physics, now known only as AVS
 Angle of Vanishing Stability, the angle at which a boat will capsize
 Acid volatile sulfide

Audio video
 Audio Video Standard, a Chinese multimedia standard
 Auditory Visual Stimulation, a controversial princip of the called Mind machine, or psychowalkman

Hardware
 Adaptive voltage scaling, Adaptive Voltage Scaling as power optimization techniques

Software
 Advanced Visualization Studio, a music visualization plugin for Winamp
 Alexa Voice Service, a cloud-based voice recognition service
 AOL Active Virus Shield, a discontinued free antivirus utility made available by AOL
 AviSynth, a script-based frameserver
 Cisco application virtual switch

Verification systems
 Address verification service, a security measure in credit card processing
 Adult Verification System, a system used by websites to confirm that someone accessing their site is of the age of majority

Other uses
 Alleanza Verdi e Sinistra, known in English as the Greens and Left Alliance, an Italian electoral coalition composed of two political parties: Italian Left and Green Europe.
 American Viola Society, an organization of viola players and enthusiasts
 American Vegan Society, an organization that promotes veganism in the United States
 Atharvaveda, aka Atharvaveda-Shaunakiya, a sacred Hindu text
 AVS-36, Soviet automatic rifle
 Nintendo Advanced Video System, or AVS, the original name for the Nintendo Entertainment System
 A Vampyre Story, the 2007 Autumn Moon Entertainment adventure game